is a nearly circular caldera lake in Shiraoi, Hokkaidō, Japan. It is part of Shikotsu-Tōya National Park. The lake is recognized as having the best water quality in all of Japan.

Resident species of the lake include a salamander species, . Since 1909, Sockeye salmon have been introduced to the lake.

See also
List of volcanoes in Japan
List of lakes in Japan

References

External links 
 
 Kuttara - Japan Meteorological Agency 
  - Japan Meteorological Agency
 Kuttara-Noboribetsu Volcano Group - Geological Survey of Japan
 

Kuttara
Kuttara
Kuttara
Shikotsu-Tōya National Park
Kuttara
Pleistocene calderas